Shiomi Station is the name of two train stations in Japan:

 Shiomi Station (Hokkaido) (汐見駅)
 Shiomi Station (Tokyo) (潮見駅)